Arcsec, ArcSec, ARCSEC, or arcsec may refer to:

 Arcsecond, a unit of angular measurement
 Arcsecant, an inverse trigonometric function

See also
sec−1 (disambiguation)
asec (disambiguation)